Dillard is both a given name and a surname. Notable people with that name include:

Given name
 Dillard E. Bird (1906–1990)
 Dillard Chandler (1907–1992)
 Dillard Crocker (1925–2014)

Surname
 Aiden Dillard, American film director and artist
 Al Dillard (born c. 1969), former college basketball player
 Andre Dillard (born 1995), American football player
 Andy Dillard (born 1981)
 Annie Dillard (born 1945), American author
 Art Dillard (1907–1960), American actor
 Bert Dillard (1909–1960), American actor
 Bill Dillard (1911–1995), American jazz trumpeter
 Chandra Dillard (born 1965)
 Don Dillard (1937–2022)
 Dwaine Dillard (1949–2008)
 Gavin Geoffrey Dillard (born 1954)
 Gordon Dillard (born 1964)
 Harrison Dillard (1923–2019), American Olympic athlete
 J. D. Dillard, American director, screenwriter, and producer
 James Dillard (disambiguation), several people
 James H. Dillard (1856–1940), American educator
 James H. (Jim) Dillard (born 1933), American politician
 James Price Dillard, Communication Professor at Penn State University
 Jarett Dillard (born 1985), American football player
 Jill Duggar Dillard (born 1991), American television personality 
 Joey Lee Dillard (1924–2009), American linguist
 John Dillard (1760–1842), early settler of North Carolina and Georgia
 Kevin Dillard (born 1989)
 Kirk Dillard (born 1955), Illinois State Senate
 Mamie Dillard (1874-1954), African American educator, clubwoman and suffragist
 Margaret Dillard, American artist
 Mark Dillard (born 1986)
 Mickey Dillard (born 1958), American former basketball player
 Mike Dillard (born 1964), drummer for the Melvins
 Oliver W. Dillard (1926–2015)
 Pat Dillard (1873–1907)
 Phillip Dillard (born 1986)
 R. H. W. Dillard (born 1937), American poet
 Raymond Bryan Dillard (1944–1993), American Old Testament scholar
 Ricky Dillard (born 1965), American gospel singer
 Stacey Dillard (born 1968)
 Stephen Dillard (born 1969), an appellate court judge and lecturer
 Steve Dillard (baseball) (born 1951), former Major League Baseball player
 Tim Dillard (born 1983)
 Tramar Dillard (AKA Flo Rida, born 1979), American rapper
 Varetta Dillard (1933–1993)
 Victor Dillard (1897–1945)
 Victoria Dillard (born 1969), American actress
 William T. Dillard (1914–2002), founder of the Dillard's department store chain

See also
 Dillard (disambiguation)